Events in the year 2019 in Uruguay.

Incumbents
 President: Tabaré Vázquez
 Vice President: Lucía Topolansky

Events

June
 30 June – 2019 Uruguayan presidential primaries

October
 27 October – first round of the 2019 Uruguayan general election

November
 24 November – runoff of the 2019 Uruguayan general election

Deaths

References

 
2010s in Uruguay
Years of the 21st century in Uruguay
Uruguay
Uruguay